Roger Meredith Harris (born 27 July 1933) is a former New Zealand cricketer who played in two Tests in 1959.

Career
A right-handed opening batsman and occasional medium pace bowler, Harris played first-class cricket for Auckland from 1955–56 to 1973–74. He made his first century in the opening match of the 1957–58 season, reaching 100 in 178 minutes and going on to make 111 on the last day of Auckland's close victory over Canterbury. In the 1958–59 Plunket Shield season, he made 329 runs at an average of 36.55. He was selected to open New Zealand's batting against England in the two Tests at the end of the season, he and his opening partner Bruce Bolton both making their Test debuts. He was not successful against England's pace bowlers, scoring 31 runs in the two matches, and played no further Tests.

In first-class cricket, Harris's top score was 157 for Auckland against Northern Districts in 1969–70. Late in his career, he was an effective all-rounder in the early years of one-day cricket in New Zealand. 

Harris and Graham Gedye opened the batting together in several hundred games for Papatoetoe Cricket Club and for Auckland in the Plunket Shield. They continued the partnership playing lawn bowls together for 30 more years.

See also
 List of Auckland representative cricketers

References

External links
 

1933 births
Living people
New Zealand Test cricketers
New Zealand cricketers
Auckland cricketers
North Island cricketers
Cricketers from Auckland